John Stiven Mendoza Valencia (born 27 June 1992) is a Colombian professional footballer who plays as a forward for Campeonato Brasileiro Série A club Santos. He earned two caps for the Colombia national football team in 2019.

Formed at Envigado and loaned to América Cali and Cúcuta Deportivo, he joined Deportivo Cali in 2013. In 2014, he was signed by Chennaiyin for the inaugural Indian Super League season, after which he joined Corinthians, being loaned back for the second installment of the ISL. He won the Golden Boot that season, helping Chennaiyin win the ISL. Following further loans at New York City FC and Bahia he signed for Amiens in January 2018. Three years later, he returned to the Campeonato Brasileiro Série A with Ceará.

Club career

Colombia
Born in Palmira, Valle del Cauca, Mendoza began his career at Envigado, making his debut in the Categoría Primera A on 8 August 2010, playing the full 90 minutes in a 1–0 home defeat to Atlético Huila. He made six appearances that season, and three in the following campaign, in addition to a further three in the 2011 Copa Colombia. After loans at América Cali and Cúcuta Deportivo, Mendoza signed a two-year contract at Deportivo Cali, the club who he supports, on 18 July 2013.

Chennaiyin FC
On 1 October 2014, Mendoza signed for Chennaiyin of the newly founded Indian Super League. He made his debut for the team, captaincy by Marco Materazzi, two weeks later in a 2–1 away win over FC Goa, replacing marquee player Elano for the final 23 minutes. On 28 October, he scored his first goals in the league, a first-half brace in a 5–1 rout of Mumbai City at the Jawaharlal Nehru Stadium. He added a third on 11 November, equalising for a 1–1 draw at FC Pune City, and a fourth eight days later in a 3–1 win over the same opponents. He finished the season with four goals from nine games as Chennaiyin won the regular season, but was absent through injury as they were eliminated in the semi-finals of the 2014 Indian Super League playoffs by Kerala Blasters.

Corinthians
On 19 December 2014, Mendoza returned to South America, joining Brazil's Sport Club Corinthians Paulista on a four-year deal. He made his debut on 8 February 2015 in the Paulista Derby against Palmeiras, starting in a 1–0 away win for the season's Campeonato Paulista. Seventeen days later, he scored his first goal for the Timão, opening a 2–0 win at Clube Atlético Linense, his only goal in seven regular season appearances. On 19 April, in the knock-out stages, he scored in the 2–2 home semi-final draw against Palmeiras, which his team lost in a penalty shootout.

Mendoza made his Campeonato Brasileiro Série A debut in the first game of the 2015 season, replacing Malcom at the end of a 1–0 win at Cruzeiro on 10 May. He scored once in ten appearances over the campaign, a consolation in a 3–1 loss at Grêmio on 4 June. Corinthians finished the season as national champions.

Loan to Chennaiyin
On 31 August 2015, Mendoza was loaned back to Chennaiyin for the 2015 season. In their opening game, away to FC Goa, he scored a hat-trick in a 4–0 victory, and five days later he scored both goals in a win over Mumbai City. His sixth goal of the campaign came on 24 October, assisted by Elano in a 2–1 home triumph over Pune City. On 21 November, he recorded his second hat-trick of the campaign, in a 4–1 win over Kerala Blasters, and three days later he opened the scoring in a 4–0 home win over Delhi Dynamos with his tenth goal of the season. Mendoza scored his eleventh of the season on 1 December, beginning a 3–0 win over Mumbai which ended their chances of the play-offs.

On 12 December, in the first leg of the semi-finals, Mendoza concluded a 3–0 home win over reigning champions Atlético de Kolkata (4–2 aggregate). In the final at Goa eight days later, he won two penalty kicks; Bruno Pelissari took the first, which was blocked by Laxmikant Kattimani but he scored the rebound, however Mendoza took the second and had it saved. Losing 2–1 with three minutes remaining, Mendoza scored an added-time winner as his team won 3–2. Mendoza was named the Hero of the League and also won the Golden Boot with 13 goals, two more than second-placed Iain Hume.

Loans to New York City and Bahia
On 8 March 2016, Mendoza moved to the third continent of his career, signing a season-long loan at New York City FC of Major League Soccer. He made his debut five days later, playing the final 23 minutes in place of Tony Taylor in a 2–2 draw against Toronto FC at the Yankee Stadium. On 30 April, his eighth game, he scored his first goal for the team to decide a 3–2 home victory within five minutes of replacing Khiry Shelton.

On 7 June 2017, Esporte Clube Bahia confirmed the loan of Mendoza for the duration of the 2017 Campeonato Brasileiro Série A. He scored 8 goals in 31 games as the Salvador-based club came 12th, including two in a 3–0 home win over Vasco da Gama on 20 August.

Amiens
On 17 January 2018, Mendoza moved to the fourth continent of his career, signing for Ligue 1 club Amiens until 2021. He made his debut that same day, starting in a 1–1 home draw with Montpellier HSC. He scored twice in 13 games over the remainder of the season, starting with a consolation in a 3–2 loss at Bordeaux ×on 10 February.

In the summer of 2019, Mendoza sought a transfer out of France after scoring just 4 times in 41 games for Amiens. His negotiations were abandoned due to two personal crises in his country; he was robbed at gunpoint in Medellín on 19 August and his brother was shot dead in Cali on 5 September. Twenty days later, he scored in 106 seconds against Bordeaux, and followed it on 28 September by opening a 1–1 draw at Angers; on 4 October he concluded his club's first-ever win over Marseille by making it 3–1.

The 2019–20 season was Mendoza's best in France with five goals from 15 games, but his team were relegated. On 5 December 2020, he scored twice in a 2–1 Ligue 2 win at Rodez.

Ceará
In late February 2021, Mendoza returned to the Brazilian top flight, signing with Ceará until the end of 2023; the team paid €600,000 for 60% of his economic rights. He made his debut on 20 March in a goalless home draw with rivals Fortaleza, playing 81 minutes; he scored twice in nine games for the runners-up, in group wins over CSA and Sport Recife at the start of April. On 8 May, his team lost the final on penalties to Bahia, and he was one of five players sent off in a brawl at the end, being suspended for a month. His first national season with the club saw him score once in 28 games – opening a 1–1 draw on his return to Bahia on 27 October.

Mendoza was the top scorer of Vozão during the 2022 season, scoring 22 goals overall, but his team suffered relegation from the top tier.

Santos
On 8 December 2022, Mendoza was announced as the new signing of Santos for the upcoming season, and signed a three-year contract with the club. He made his debut for the club the following 14 January, starting in a 2–1 Campeonato Paulista home win over Mirassol.

Mendoza scored his first goal for Peixe on 28 January 2023, netting the equalizer in a 1–1 home draw against Ferroviária.

International career
Mendoza represented Colombia at the 2009 FIFA U-17 World Cup in Nigeria and the 2011 South American U-20 Championship in Peru.

In late October 2019, following good form for Amiens, manager Carlos Queiroz called up Mendoza for the senior team, for friendlies against neighbours Peru and Ecuador in the United States. His debut was as a 61st-minute substitute for Luis Díaz at the Hard Rock Stadium, in a 1–0 win over the former.

Career statistics

Honours
Corinthians
Campeonato Brasileiro Série A: 2015

Chennaiyin
Indian Super League: 2015

Individual
Indian Super League Hero of the League: 2015
Indian Super League Golden Boot: 2015

References

External links

ISL profile

1992 births
Living people
People from Palmira, Valle del Cauca
Sportspeople from Valle del Cauca Department
Association football forwards
Colombian footballers
Colombia under-20 international footballers
Colombia youth international footballers
Colombia international footballers
Colombian expatriate footballers
Colombian expatriate sportspeople in Brazil
Colombian expatriate sportspeople in India
Colombian expatriate sportspeople in the United States
Colombian expatriate sportspeople in France
Expatriate footballers in Brazil
Expatriate footballers in India
Expatriate footballers in France
Expatriate soccer players in the United States
Chennaiyin FC players
Sport Club Corinthians Paulista players
Indian Super League players
Campeonato Brasileiro Série A players
Envigado F.C. players
América de Cali footballers
Cúcuta Deportivo footballers
Deportivo Cali footballers
New York City FC players
Esporte Clube Bahia players
Amiens SC players
Ceará Sporting Club players
Santos FC players
Categoría Primera A players
Categoría Primera B players
Major League Soccer players
Ligue 1 players
Ligue 2 players